Brazilian Antarctica ( or Antártica Brasileira) is the Antarctic territory south of 60°S, and from 28°W to 53°W, proposed as "Zone of Interest" by geopolitical scholar Therezinha de Castro. While the substance of that designation has never been precisely defined, it does not formally contradict the Argentine and British claims geographically overlapping with that zone (the zone shares a border but does not overlap with the Chilean Antarctic Territory to its west). The country formally expressed its reservations with respect to its territorial rights in Antarctica when it acceded to the Antarctic Treaty on 16 May 1975, making the first official mention of the Frontage Theory, which states (simplified) that sovereignty over each point in Antarctica properly belongs to the first country whose non-Antarctic territory one would reach when travelling north in a straight line from such a point. The Frontage Theory (Teoria da Defrontação) was proposed by Brazilian geopolitical scholar Therezinha de Castro and published in her book Antártica: Teoria da Defrontação.

The peninsula is the northernmost, most accessible, and warmest part of the Antarctic continent and a number of countries, therefore, have research bases located on it.

History

In 1982 the Brazilian government launched their first Antarctic expedition, and a year later built their first base (named Comandante Ferraz, for a deceased naval officer active in Antarctica), which has been active year-round since then. Despite their status as newcomers, Brazilian geopolitical writers have had considerable influence on the nation's Antarctic policies (especially during the period of military dictatorship under a series of unelected general/presidents from 1964 to 1985), although there is not a national Brazilian Antarctic consciousness similar to that of Argentina.

In February 1991, President Fernando Collor de Mello reaffirmed Brazil's interest in the region by visiting the Brazilian Antarctic base, where he spent three days. He was the first Brazilian president to set foot in the Antarctic.

In January 2008, 13 congressmen members of the Brazilian Antarctica Parliamentary Committee visited the Brazilian Antarctic base. Another visit by the members of Congress took place in January 2009.

On February 16, 2008, President Luiz Inácio Lula da Silva and a delegation of twenty-three people, including the First Lady Marisa Letícia, visited the country's base in Antarctica. The Brazilian Government defined the presidential trip as a "political gesture" in support of the work displayed by Brazilian scientists and military personnel.

In 2009 Brazil made its first national scientific expedition to the Antarctic ice sheet. The expedition integrated atmospheric, glaciological, geological and geophysical studies along the Patriot Hills area and also along the subglacial lake Ellsworth area.

In the early morning of February 25, 2012, with 60 people at the base, a fire started by an estimated unjustified explosion in the Praça das Máquinas, where the station's power generators are located. As it was linked to the rest of the facilities, the fire spread. A boatswain (Carlos Alberto Vieira Figueredo) and a first sergeant (Roberto Lopes dos Santos) were killed because they could not leave the site and a sergeant was injured but was taken alive to the Polish station where he received first aid and was later transferred to a Chilean base.

In 2020, Brazil opened a new research facility, 8 years after fire destroyed the previous one.

References

Notes

Bibliography
 Castro, Therezinha. "Antárctica: Assunto do Momento". Revista de Clube Militar (Brazil), 1958.
 Castro, Therezinha. Atlas-Texto de Geopolítica do Brasil. Rio de Janeiro: Capemi Editora, 1982.
 Child, Jack. Antarctica and South American Geopolitics: Frozen Lebensraum. New York: Praeger, 1988, Chapter 6.
 Coelho, Aristides Pinto. "Novas tendências". Boletim Antártico, no. 4, Jan 1985.
 Dodds, Klaus. Geopolitics in Antarctica : views from the Southern Oceanic Rim. Chichester ; New York : Published in association with Scott Polar Research Institute, University of Cambridge by J. Wiley, 1997.
 Moneta, Carlos J., ed. La Antártida en el Sistema Internacional del Futuro. Buenos Aires: Grupo Editor Lationoamericano, 1988.
 Schmied, Julie. La Política Antárctica de los Países Latinoamericanos. Madrid: Instituto de Cuestiones Internacionales, 1988.
 WorldStatesmen - Antarctica
 Flags of the World - Antarctica
 Map showing Brazilian Antarctica
 Antarctica, But Sliced Differently
 W.L. de Freitas, A Antártica no contexto do Sistema Interamericano e a paz nas Américas, Colégio Interamericano de Defesa, Washington, D.C.

External links

 Brazilian Antarctica Parliamentary Committee Official website
 Official website of the Brazilian Antarctic Programme
 Brazilian Navy's Antarctic Programme website 
 National Meteorology Center at the Com. Ferraz Antarctic Station - Live webcams and weather data from the Brazilian Antarctic Base.
 Website of the Brazilian Ministry of Environment's Antarctic Project
 Teoria de Defrontação